Get a Clue is a 2002 Disney Channel Original Movie starring Lindsay Lohan as Lexy Gold, a teenage high school student who investigates a mystery after one of her teachers goes missing. The film premiered on the Disney Channel on June 28, 2002. It was directed by Maggie Greenwald and was written by Alana Sanko.

Plot 
Lexy Gold (Lindsay Lohan) lives amongst the wealthy and elite of Manhattan, New York. Clad in Prada, she prides herself on her ability to get the scoop and serve it up in her school newspaper's advice column. She competes for status on the newspaper with middle-class Jack Downey (Bug Hall), the editor. When an article and photograph Lexy has taken of her teacher, Mr. Orlando Walker (Ian Gomez), is published in the city's daily paper, he goes missing and his car is found in the East River. With help from Lexy's best friend Jen (Brenda Song) and one of her schoolmates Gabe (Ali Mukaddam), Lexy and Jack set out to solve the mystery behind the disappearance.

Their teacher, Miss Gertrude Dawson (Amanda Plummer), becomes involved as she and Mr. Walker were romantically involved. Jack receives a message from Mr. Walker about a scholarship. Lexy and Jack search his old apartment, where they run into Detective Charles Meany (Charles Shaughnessy), who is searching for Mr. Walker. Jen and Gabe watch Miss Dawson at Gabe's house with a video camera to keep an eye on her. Lexy and Jack later meet Mr. Walker's mother, Mrs. Petrossian (Sylvia Lennick), at her house. They discover that Mr. Walker changed his identity after being accused of stealing $10,000,000. Mr. Walker later receives a letter from the real person who stole the money, framing Mr. Walker.

The group and Mr. Walker meet at a hotel to pretend to receive the money. Miss Dawson shows up at the hotel and is taken hostage by the real thief. Lexy and Jack search the halls for the man, who is revealed to be Detective Meany, whose real name is Falco Grandville, Mr. Walker's boss when he worked at a bank in Arizona, and the man who had framed Mr. Walker for the money theft. The team catches up with him and he is later arrested. It is later revealed that Mr. Walker's mother found a brooch at Falco's office by chance and decided to keep it; Falco has purchased the expensive canary diamond brooch to hide the stolen $10 million, and blamed Walker for its loss. After Mr. Walker is pronounced a free man at last, he later asks Miss Dawson to marry him. At the end, it shows the wedding with Jack, Lexy, Jen, and Gabe. Jack and Lexy share a moment between themselves before the four teens walk down the street talking about going bowling.

Cast
 Lindsay Lohan as Alexandra "Lexy" Gold, a teenage amateur journalist.
 Brenda Song as Jenn, Lexy's fashion-conscious best friend.
 Bug Hall as Jack Downey, editor of the school newspaper. 
 Ian Gomez as Nicholas Petrossian / Mr. Orlando Walker, one of Lexy's teachers.
 Ali Mukaddam as Gabe, an amateur photographer.
 Dan Lett as Frank Gold, Lexy's father, a journalist with the New York Times.
 Amanda Plummer as Miss Gertrude Dawson, a teacher who is in love with Mr. Walker.
 Charles Shaughnessy as Detective Charles Meany / Falco Grandville, the main antagonist of the film.
 Kim Roberts as Mrs. Stern
 Eric Fink as Mr. Goldblum
 Jennifer Pisana as Taylor Gold, Lexy's tech-savvy little sister.
 Sylvia Lennick as Mrs. Petrossian
 Cheryl MacInnis as Mrs. Somerville
 Timm Zemanek as Mr. Greenblatt
 Gerry Quigley as Detective Potter
 Craig Lamar Traylor (unconfirmed)
 Keenan MacWilliam as Karen

Production
Production began in May 2001. Get a Clue was written by Alana Sanko; the script was still unfinished by the time filming had begun. Maggie Greenwald was confirmed to direct and Lindsay Lohan was cast as Lexy Gold, ending her three-movie deal with The Walt Disney Company. The film was primarily filmed in Toronto, Ontario, Canada, with some of the exterior scenes filmed on location in Manhattan, New York. Millington Prep, the school Lexy and her friends attend, was filmed at Bishop Strachan School in Toronto.

The film was originally to be released in January 2002 as the Disney Channel Movie of the Month. A well-concealed reshoot took place in late 2001 to film a different ending concluding that the villain in the film was Meany. In the original ending, the villain turned out to be Mrs. Stern, a teacher at Lexy's school who had known Mr. Walker while he was living in Arizona. This ending was shown on the DVD (though the viewer has the option to watch either ending when the movie reaches 61 minutes, with the Mrs. Stern ending shown in a different aspect ratio than the rest of the movie). The film was heavily promoted and frequently re-aired during its initial summer. A song by the band Prozzak, "Get a Clue", appeared in the film and the music video was shown on Disney Channel at the time of its release. The name of the band was changed to "Simon and Milo", the characters depicted in the music video so their band name would not be associated with drugs.

Notes

External links

 

2002 television films
2002 films
2002 comedy films
2000s comedy mystery films
2000s English-language films
2000s high school films
2000s teen comedy films
American comedy mystery films
American comedy television films
American high school films
American teen comedy films
Disney Channel Original Movie films
Films directed by Maggie Greenwald
Films scored by David Mansfield
Films set in Manhattan
Films shot in New York City
Films shot in Toronto
Teen mystery films
2000s American films